Jay Frederick Allen II (born November 22, 2002)  is an American professional baseball outfielder for the Cincinnati Reds organization.

Amateur career
Allen played high school baseball, football, and basketball at John Carroll Catholic High School in Fort Pierce, Florida. Allen committed to play college baseball for the Florida Gators.

Professional career
Allen was selected in the 2021 Major League Baseball draft by the Cincinnati Reds as the final selection of the first round; he was the 30th player selected and the Reds' second selection of the first round, as the Reds had received a compensatory pick due to the Los Angeles Dodgers signing Trevor Bauer. Allen signed with the Reds on July 20, 2021, for a $2.4 million signing bonus.

Allen made his professional debut with the Rookie-level Arizona Complex League Reds, slashing .328/.440/.557 with three home runs, 11 RBIs, and 14 stolen bases over 19 games. He opened the 2022 season with the Daytona Tortugas of the Single-A Florida State League.

References

External links

 Profile at MaxPreps

Baseball players from Florida
African-American baseball players
Baseball outfielders
Living people
2002 births
21st-century African-American sportspeople
Arizona Complex League Reds players
Daytona Tortugas players
Dayton Dragons players